The Grand Egyptian Museum (GEM;  al-Matḥaf al-Maṣriyy al-Kabīr), also known as the Giza Museum, is an archaeological museum under construction in Giza, Egypt. It will house artifacts of ancient Egypt, including the complete Tutankhamun collection, and is set to be the largest archaeological museum in the world. Many pieces in its collection will be displayed for the first time.

The museum was built by a joint venture of the Belgian BESIX Group and the Egyptian Orascom Construction company. , there is no announced opening date, despite past estimates ranging from 2020 to 2023.

Overview 
The building design was decided by an architectural competition announced on 7 January 2002. The organisers received 1,557 entries from 82 countries, making it the second largest architectural competition in history. In the second stage of the competition, 20 entries submitted additional information on their designs. Judging was complete by 2 June 2003. The competition was won by architects Róisín Heneghan and Shi-Fu Peng, and their company Heneghan Peng Architects of Ireland; the awarded prize was US$250,000. The building was designed by Heneghan Peng Architects, Buro Happold, and Arup. The landscape and site masterplan was designed by West 8; the exhibition masterplan, exhibition design, and museology was led by Atelier Brückner. On 2 February 2010, Hill International announced that Egypt's Ministry of Culture had signed a contract with a joint venture of Hill and EHAF Consulting Engineers to provide project management services during the design and construction of the Grand Egyptian Museum.

The building is shaped like a chamfered triangle in plan. The building's north and south walls line up directly with the Great Pyramid of Khufu and the Pyramid of Menkaure. The front of the museum includes a large plaza filled with date palms and a façade made of translucent alabaster stone. Inside the main entrance is a large atrium, where large statues will be exhibited.

The project is estimated to cost US$550 million, of which US$300 million will be financed from Japanese loans. The remaining costs are financed by the Supreme Council of Antiquities, other donations, and international funds.

The new museum is designed to include newer technologies, such as virtual reality. The museum will also be an international center of communication between museums, to promote direct contact with other local and international museums. The Grand Egyptian Museum will include a children's museum, conference center, training center, and workshops designed similarly to the old Pharaonic places.

History

On 5 January 2002, then-Egyptian President Hosni Mubarak laid the foundation stone of the Grand Egyptian Museum. 

In 2006, the 3,200 years old Statue of Ramesses II was relocated from Ramses Square in Cairo to the Grand Egyptian Museum site, near that Giza Plateau. It was moved to the atrium of the museum in January 2018.

In 2007, GEM secured a $300 million loan from the Japan Bank for International Cooperation. The Egyptian Government will fund $147 million while the remaining $150 million will be funded through donations and international organisations.

In late August 2008, the design team submitted over 5,000 drawings to the Egyptian Ministry of Culture. Following this, the construction tender was announced in October 2008. Earthmoving has begun to excavate the site for the building.

Tendering was due in September 2009, with an estimated completion date of 2013.

On 11 January 2012, a joint venture between Egypt's Orascom Construction (OC) and the Belgian BESIX was awarded the contract for phase three of the Grand Egyptian Museum (GEM), a deal valued at $810 million.

In January 2018, Besix and Orascom brought in and installed an 82-ton, 3,200-year-old statue of Ramses II in the Grand Egyptian Museum. It was the first artefact to be installed in the Museum, during construction due to its size.

On 29 April 2018, a fire broke out near the entrance of the GEM but artifacts were not damaged and the cause of the fire was unknown.

In May 2018, the last of King Tutankhamun's chariots was moved to GEM. 
 
In November 2018, the estimate for a full opening was pushed back to last quarter of 2020, according to Tarek Tawfik, GEM's director.

In April 2020, the planned opening of the museum was pushed to 2021 due to the COVID-19 pandemic.  There have been further delays, and there is no official opening date available.

The GEM is available for private tours in advance of its official opening.

Logo design 

On 10 June 2018, the museum's "logo" was revealed, which will be used in the museum's promotional campaign in Egypt and the world. The Lebanese-Dutch logo was designed by Tariq Atrissi. The cost of the design amounted to 800,000 Egyptian pounds, which included the costs of designing the museum exhibition implemented by the German company "Atelier Bruckner".

Exhibits 

The exhibition will cover about one-third of the total museum grounds displaying c.18,000 artifacts (c.5000 objects in the Tutankhamun galleries, and c.13,000 objects in the other galleries) from the museum's total collections of c.50,000 objects. The main attraction will be the first exhibition of the full tomb collection of King Tutankhamun. The collection includes about 5,000 items in total and will be relocated from the Egyptian Museum in Cairo. Other objects will be relocated from storages and museums in Luxor, Minya, Sohag, Assiut, Beni Suef, Fayoum, the Delta, and Alexandria.

In August 2021 the reconstructed Khufu ship, a solar barque, was relocated to the Grand Egyptian Museum from the Giza Solar boat museum beside the Great Pyramid.

See also
 List of museums of Egyptian antiquities

References

External links
 Official website
Detailed building description
JICA-GEM Joint Conservation project

Proposed museums in Egypt
Archaeological museums in Egypt
Egyptological collections in Egypt
Giza Plateau
Buildings and structures under construction
Government agencies of Egypt